The 2010–11 Providence Friars men's basketball team represented Providence College in the Big East Conference. The team finished with a 4–14 conference record and a 15–17 record overall.

In his third season with the team, head coach Keno Davis returned two starters and just eight players overall after a tumultuous offseason that included the dismissal of the team's leading scorer in 2009–10, forward Jamine Peterson, as well as the transfer or dismissal of three other players.

The Friars were led in scoring by senior forward Marshon Brooks, who finished first the conference and second in Division I with 24.6 points per game. He set conference records for single-game scoring (52 points vs. Notre Dame on February 23) and for single-season conference scoring (468 points). Brooks was named to the All-Big East First Team and the Associated Press All-American Third Team following the season and was a finalist for the 2011 John R. Wooden Award.

After losing their first six conference games, including a narrow home defeat to #5 Pittsburgh on January 4, the Friars managed back-to-back wins over ranked opponents for the first time since 1998. On January 22, they defeated #19 Louisville at home before knocking off #8 Villanova at home on January 26. However, the Friars did not receive votes in either the AP Poll or Coaches' Poll at any point in the season.

The Friars lost seven of their final eight regular season conference games, finishing 14th in the conference before falling to Marquette in the first round of the 2011 Big East men's basketball tournament. Davis was fired three days later.

Offseason
On the morning of April 12, 2010 two freshmen – center James Still and guard Johnnie Lacy – were arrested outside of campus after Lacy and Still randomly attacked another student on the street. Lacy and Still were charged with assault and suspended from the school the same day; Lacy had already planned on transferring at the end of the spring semester. Fellow freshman guard Duke Mondy was detained for questioning, but was not charged. Still was later dismissed from the school.

On May 18, 2010, sophomore forward Jamine Peterson – the Friars' leading scorer in 2009–10 and an All-Big East Honorable Mention – announced to SLAM Magazine that he was turning professional and would pursue playing opportunities overseas. The same day, the school announced Peterson was dismissed from the team for a team rules violation, which was later revealed to have been an on-campus incident involving Peterson and AAU players from Boston on April 23 or 24, 2010.

On the morning of July 18, 2010, redshirt freshman forward Kadeem Batts was arrested outside of a Providence nightclub and was charged with disorderly conduct and failing to disperse after he did not follow police orders to leave the area. The charges were dismissed after six months.

The Friars also lost two graduating starting guards, Sharaud Curry and Brian McKenzie, as well as graduating reserve guard Luke Burchett. Center Ray Hall graduated but returned to the team for a fifth year of eligibility, while junior forward Russ Permenter transferred after one season with the Friars. In addition, assistant coach Pat Skerry was hired by Pittsburgh head coach Jamie Dixon as an assistant coach on May 27. He was replaced by Boston AAU coach Chris Driscoll, who coached Class of 2010 recruits Gerard Coleman and Ron Giplaye. Also hired as Director of Player Development and Video Operations was former NBA player Kevin Gamble, who played for Keno Davis' father Tom Davis at Iowa.

A week after Skerry's departure, 2011 recruit Naadir Tharpe, a guard rated 4/5 stars by Rivals.com who had committed in March 2010, decommitted from Providence due to Skerry's departure. The next day, June 3, the team lost another 4-star recruit by Rivals.com from the 2010 class, guard Joe Young. However, the school did not allow Young to be released from his signed National Letter of Intent; his family stated Young "would never play at Providence." Young later enrolled in the University of Houston, where is father, Michael, was the school's Director of Basketball Operations. Due to NCAA regulations, Young sat out his first year at Houston before returning for three seasons of eligibility.

During the 2010–11 season, Providence lost a top class of 2012 recruit and Rhode Island native Ricky Ledo, who gave Providence a verbal commitment in December 2010, only to rescind his commitment in January 2011.

Roster

Depth chart

Incoming recruits

Schedule

|-
!colspan=9| Exhibition games

|-
!colspan=9| Non-conference games

|-
!colspan=8| Big East regular season

|-
!colspan=8| Big East tournament

Awards and honors

References

External links
2010–11 Providence Friars men's basketball media guide

Providence Friars men's basketball seasons
Providence Friars
Providence Friars men's basketball
Providence Friars men's basketball